Do Chehere is a 1977 Bollywood drama film directed by Kewal Misra produced by Ratan Kumar Purohit. The film stars Dharmendra, Prem Nath and Bindu.

Cast

Dharmendra ...Kanwar Pran (Drunkard) / C.I.D. S.P. Shukla 
Prem Nath ...Qawaali Singer / INSP. 
Bindu ...Dancer 
Mahipal   
Veerendra ...Raj 
Aruna Irani ...Rani / Mohini 
Ramesh Deo ...Ramesh  
Padma Khanna   
Ram Mohan   
Durga Khote ...Daadima 
Murad ...Maharaj 
Shekhar Purohi   
Firoz Irani   
Master Maruti    
Master Ravi ...Munna

Music
"Aaj Ki Raat Pine De Saakhi, Kal Se Taubha Taubha" - Mohammed Rafi, Hemlata, Minoo Purushottam, Manna Dey
"O Saathi Preet Ki Reet Nibhana" - Yesudas
"Chali Thi Thumka De Ke Thaska" - Asha Bhosle, Minoo Purushottam
"Iss Raat Ke Sannate Me" - Asha Bhosle
"Mai Toh Sapne Sanwaar Kar Baithi" - Asha Bhosle
"Mere Chehala Bhanwar Angoori Piye" - Usha Mangeshkar

External links
 

1977 films
Films scored by Sonik-Omi
1970s Hindi-language films
1977 drama films
Indian drama films